In the mythology of the African Songhai people, Zin Kibaru or Zinkibaru is a blind, river-dwelling spirit who commands fish.

References

Jinn
Songhai mythology
West African legendary creatures

Water spirits